Pentti Juhani Oinonen (born 11 June 1952 in Kontiolahti) is a Finnish politician and a former member of the Parliament of Finland, representing the Finns Party and later Blue Reform. He was elected to Finnish Parliament in 2007 for Northern Savonia, and maintained his seat in 2011. In 2015 Oinonen was re-elected again, this time for Savonia-Karelia.

On 13 June 2017, Oinonen and 19 others left the Finns Party parliamentary group to found the New Alternative parliamentary group, which later became known as Blue Reform. In March 2018, Oinonen announced that he was leaving politics and would not run in any future elections.

References

External links
Parliament of Finland: Pentti Oinonen 

1952 births
Living people
People from Kontiolahti
Finnish Lutherans
Finns Party politicians
Blue Reform politicians
Members of the Parliament of Finland (2007–11)
Members of the Parliament of Finland (2011–15)
Members of the Parliament of Finland (2015–19)